"Wait for Life" is a song produced by Emile Haynie featuring the vocals of singer-songwriter Lana Del Rey. The pair wrote the song together alongside Thomas Bartlett. The song was released as a single to promote Haynie's debut album, We Fall, on 29 January 2015.

Background
After initial success as a producer for artists including Kanye West, Kid Cudi, and Eminem, Haynie gained notable recognition as a music producer. Through 2011 and 2012, Haynie began working with American indie pop singer Lana Del Rey, producing eight singles from her Born to Die album, namely the title-track, "Off to the Races", "Carmen", "Blue Jeans", "Summertime Sadness", "National Anthem", "Blue Velvet" and "Dark Paradise".

According to Haynie, he was struggling emotionally in 2013 and 2014, leading to him not having the same amount of involvement in Del Rey's follow-up record, Ultraviolence, as he had wanted to have: "I tried doing regular production work... one of the things that was hard at the beginning was I was supposed to be working on Lana's Ultraviolence, and she's someone who is so important to me, and I just couldn't do it. She'd written it already and she had her songs that she'd written on piano, and it would have been more of a production gig, and I just couldn't do it. I made attempts with some of these amazing artists I would have always loved to have worked with, but I just couldn't focus. Then, once it became a real thing that I was making my own album, I didn't need to do anything else."

An article in The Fader stated "When Lana came to Haynie's studio in New York for an Ultraviolence session one afternoon, the two got talking about relationships instead, and spontaneously recorded a demo. That session later became the We Fall track "Wait For Life," a song about impossible romance that's pinned around Lana's soft teasing out of the phrase, I'm lonely."

Speculation began in December 2014 about Haynie and Del Rey possibly releasing a collaborative effort together. Suspicions were confirmed in early-January when the track "Wait for Life" was confirmed.

Composition
Lyrically, the song tells the story of a tragic romance which involves one person maintaining unrealistic expectations that the relationship's fate will change. Haynie revealed in an interview that We Fall is indeed a narrative that details his recovery from a shattered romance.

Critical reception
Since its release, the song has received universal acclaim from music critics. Emma-Lee Moss of Vice was positive of the song, praising "Lana's husky warble on the line “All I want is to make your money grow”", further adding that it is "[one] of the simplest tracks that leave a lasting impression" Caitilin White of MTV was positive of the pairing of Del Rey's vocals and Haynie's production. Justin Block of Complex praised Haynie's choice of having Del Rey's "sultry voice blast ballads on a deep, multi-faceted track" adding that "Country western strings slide across the song's intro before transitioning into mixture of synths, orchestral strings, and sombering piano chords. Lana blesses Haynie's instrumentation with a silky-soft, airy performance." He would also encouraged the similar sound it had to Del Rey's Born to Die, adding that hit had also matured by incorporating "some of Lana's wholly downtrodden bite."

Personnel
 Emile Haynie – producer, songwriter
 Lana Del Rey – lead vocals, backing vocals, songwriter
 Doveman – songwriter, piano, mellotron
 Larry Gold – woodwind, strings, horns
 Greg Leisz – pedal steele guitar

Credits adapted from the song liner notes on Genius.

References

Lana Del Rey songs
2015 songs
Songs written by Emile Haynie
Songs written by Lana Del Rey
Songs written by Doveman